Shobnall is a civil parish in the district of East Staffordshire, Staffordshire, England.  It contains 15 buildings that are recorded in the National Heritage List for England.  Of these, two are listed at Grade II*, the middle grade, and the others are at Grade II, the lowest grade.  The parish is in the western part of the town of Burton upon Trent, and its listed buildings include the town hall and a brewery and associated structures.  The Trent and Mersey Canal passes through the parish, and two mileposts on the canal are listed.  The other listed buildings include houses and associated structures, a farmhouse, a church, a bridge, and a statue.


Key

Buildings

References

Citations

Sources

Lists of listed buildings in Staffordshire
 Listed